Alisha Newton (born July 22, 2001) is a Canadian actress. She is known for her role as Georgie Fleming Morris on the Canadian television drama series Heartland.

Life and career
Born in Vancouver, Alisha Newton began appearing in commercials at the age of four and began acting four years later.

Newton played Young Annabeth Chase in the post-2013 release, Twentieth Century Fox's Percy Jackson: Sea of Monsters.

Since 2012, Newton has been a series regular on the CBC drama series Heartland. She portrays Georgie Fleming Morris, a child who finds a nurturing home at Heartland Ranch, owned by Jack Bartlett (Shaun Johnston), who runs the ranch with his granddaughters Amy (Amber Marshall), and her sister Lou (Michelle Morgan).

In 2014, Newton played the minor role of Sofia Dunlap in the 2014 film The Tree That Saved Christmas.

Filmography

Awards and nominations

References

External links
 

2001 births
21st-century Canadian actresses
Actresses from Vancouver
American film actresses
American television actresses
Canadian television actresses
Living people
21st-century American women